Monte Verena is a mountain of the Veneto, Italy.

Mountains of Veneto
Mountains of the Alps
Vicentine Alps
Two-thousanders of Italy